Hafton House (also known as Hafton Castle) is a Category B listed country house in Hunters Quay, Argyll and Bute, Scotland. The property is located on the southern shores of the Holy Loch. It dates to the late 18th century, built to a design by David Hamilton, and it received its historic designation in 1971. It is two storeys, with a higher tower.

One of its first owners was James Hunter (1814–1854). As of 1841, Hunter was living at Hafton "age 25 (sic), of independent means, with his wife [Eliza] and children, Eliza age 4, James age 3 and William age 4 months, as well as other Hunter relatives and 7 female servants". At least one other child  — a daughter, Rosina Jane — was born later. James Hunter Sr. was still resident there in 1851, age 37. James Hunter Jr. purchased nearby Dunloskin Farm in the 1870s.

In the 1870s, the property was 5,740 acres. 

The grounds also contain a gatehouse and a bridge.

Gallery

See also
List of listed buildings in Argyll and Bute

References

External links
 Hafton House official website
 Hafton House - Argyll & Bute Council
 A 19th-century photograph of the building

Category B listed buildings in Argyll and Bute
Buildings and structures in Hunters Quay
Country houses in Argyll and Bute